The 1924 United States Senate election in Arkansas took place on November 4, 1924. Incumbent Democratic Senator Joseph Taylor Robinson was re-elected to a third term in office over Republican Charles F. Cole.

General election

Candidates
Charles F. Cole (Republican)
Joseph Taylor Robinson, incumbent Senator since 1913 (Democratic)

Results

See also
1924 United States Senate elections

References 

1924
Arkansas
United States Senate